"Aquellas pequeñas cosas" (English: Those little things) is a song by Spanish singer-songwriter Joan Manuel Serrat. In 2008, Serrat recorded an Italian version titled "Quelle piccole cose" for the double-disc Quelle piccole cose by the Italian group Pan Brumisti.

Other versions 
 David Cavazos
 Rolando Ojeda
 Ketama
 Vieja Trova Santiaguera
 Alejandra Tafich
 Tukuta Gordillo
 Ginesa Ortega
 El Consorcio
 Joan Isaac (Catalan version), in collaboration with Serrat.
 Romina Bianco
 Manu Tenorio
 Caco Senante
 Verónica Rojas
 Mario Monge
 Yaneli
 Somos amigos
 Novo
 Mercedes Sosa
 Tania Libertad
 Marta Gómez
 Alfredo Carrillo
 Miguel Hinojosa
 Presuntos Implicados
 El Canto del Loco
 Regina Orozco
 Nicho Hinojosa

References

Spanish-language songs